Ibbani Karagithu is a 1983 Indian Kannada-language drama film directed by K. V. Jayaram and produced by Mohan. It is based on the novel of the same name by Saisuthe. The film stars Ananth Nag, Lakshmi, Lokesh and Deepa.

Cast 
 Anant Nag 
 Lakshmi 
 Deepa
 Lokesh
 K. S. Ashwath 
 Balakrishna
 Leelavathi
 Uma Shivakumar
 M. S. Umesh
 Mysore Lokesh
 Jaggesh

Soundtrack 
The music of the film was composed by Rajan–Nagendra with lyrics by Chi. Udaya Shankar. The songs "Cheluve Oh Cheluve" and "Thanu Ninnadu" composed for the film were received extremely well.

References 

1983 films
1980s Kannada-language films
Films scored by Rajan–Nagendra
Films based on Indian novels